The Psalm 92, known as Mizmor Shir L'yom HaShabbat, is ostensibly dedicated to the Shabbat day. In the slightly different numbering system used in the Greek Septuagint and Latin Vulgate translations of the Bible, this psalm is Psalm 91.

Although it can be recited any day, in Jewish tradition it is generally reserved for Shabbat and is also recited during the morning services on festival days.

Text
The psalm is originally written in the Hebrew language.

The Hebrew text is divided into 16 verses, as Psalm 92:1 comprises the designation
A Psalm. A Song for the Sabbath day. (NKJV) 
This is not numbered as a separate verse in the English versions. Verses 1–15 in English versions correspond to verses 2–16 in the Hebrew text.

King James Version
 A Psalm or Song for the sabbath day.
 It is a good thing to give thanks unto the LORD, and to sing praises unto thy name, O most High:
 To shew forth thy lovingkindness in the morning, and thy faithfulness every night,
 Upon an instrument of ten strings, and upon the psaltery; upon the harp with a solemn sound.
 For thou, LORD, hast made me glad through thy work: I will triumph in the works of thy hands.
 O LORD, how great are thy works! and thy thoughts are very deep.
 A brutish man knoweth not; neither doth a fool understand this.
 When the wicked spring as the grass, and when all the workers of iniquity do flourish; it is that they shall be destroyed for ever:
 But thou, LORD, art most high for evermore.
 For, lo, thine enemies, O LORD, for, lo, thine enemies shall perish; all the workers of iniquity shall be scattered.
 But my horn shalt thou exalt like the horn of an unicorn: I shall be anointed with fresh oil.
 Mine eye also shall see my desire on mine enemies, and mine ears shall hear my desire of the wicked that rise up against me.
 The righteous shall flourish like the palm tree: he shall grow like a cedar in Lebanon.
 Those that be planted in the house of the LORD shall flourish in the courts of our God.
 They shall still bring forth fruit in old age; they shall be fat and flourishing;
 To shew that the LORD is upright: he is my rock, and there is no unrighteousness in him.

Textual witnesses
Some early manuscripts containing the text of this chapter in Hebrew are of the Masoretic Text tradition, which includes the Aleppo Codex (10th century), and Codex Leningradensis (1008).

The extant palimpsest Aq includes a translation into Koine Greek by Aquila of Sinope in c. 130 CE, containing verses 1–10.

Verse 1
It is good to give thanks to the Lord,And to sing praises to Your name, O Most High;Franz Delitzsch, who sub-titles this psalm "sabbath thoughts", observes that honouring the Sabbath is "is good ... not merely good in the eyes of God, but also good for man, beneficial to the heart, pleasant and blessed".

Uses
Judaism
Psalm 92 is recited three times during all of Shabbat:
Part of Kabbalat Shabbat. This recitation officially ushers in the Shabbat.
During Pesukei Dezimra. (It is also recited in Pesukei Dezimra on a Yom Tov that occurs on a weekday, although some communities omit the first verse.)
The song of the day in the Shir Shel Yom of Shabbat.
Some communities recite it immediately after the Torah reading at Mincha of the Sabbath.

Verse 1 is part of Mishnah Tamid 7:4.

Verse 1 is part of Likel Asher Shabbat recited in the blessings preceding the Shema on Shabbat, and some add the beginning of Verse 2 as well.

According to the Midrash, Psalm 92 was said by Adam. Adam was created on Friday, and he said this psalm on the onset of the Shabbat. It is not a psalm that speaks about the Shabbat, but one that was said on the Shabbat: this was Adam's first day of existence and he marveled at the work of the Creator.

Christianity
In the Catholic Church, Psalm 92 is appointed to be read at Lauds (Morning Prayer) on Saturday in the fourth week of the month.

Musical settings
Psalm 92 "Bonum est confiteri Domino"'' H.195, for soloists, chorus, 2 treble viols or violins and continuo, was set to music by Marc-Antoine Charpentier (1687 - 88)
Psalm 92 was set to music by Franz Schubert for Salomon Sulzer.
The Requiem Ebraico (Hebrew Requiem) (1945) by Austrian-American composer Eric Zeisl, a setting of Psalm 92 dedicated to the memory of the composer's father "and the other countless victims of the Jewish tragedy in Europe", is considered the first major work of Holocaust commemoration.
American composer Mark Alburger also composed a musical setting for Psalm 92.

See also

Wikisource - Psalm 92
 Related Bible parts: Psalm 1, Jeremiah 17

References

External links

 in Hebrew and English - Mechon-mamre
 Recordings for musical settings to the second verse of Psalm 92 (in Hebrew) at the Zemirot Database
 Musical settings to the last four verses of Psalm 92 ("The righteous shall flourish like a palm tree...") at Zemirot Database

092
Shabbat prayers
Shacharit for Shabbat and Yom Tov